Alberto Santiago (born 4 June 1933) is a Puerto Rican former sports shooter. He competed in the 50 metre rifle, prone event at the 1968 Summer Olympics.

References

1933 births
Living people
Puerto Rican male sport shooters
Olympic shooters of Puerto Rico
Shooters at the 1968 Summer Olympics
Sportspeople from Ponce, Puerto Rico